Johannes "Jan" Willem Brand (June 24, 1908 in Amsterdam – June 29, 1969 in Rotterdam) was a Dutch field hockey player who competed in the 1928 Summer Olympics.

He was a member of the Dutch field hockey team, which won the silver medal. He played all four matches as halfback.

External links
 
profile

1908 births
1969 deaths
Dutch male field hockey players
Olympic field hockey players of the Netherlands
Field hockey players at the 1928 Summer Olympics
Olympic silver medalists for the Netherlands
Field hockey players from Amsterdam
Olympic medalists in field hockey
Medalists at the 1928 Summer Olympics
20th-century Dutch people